The Alan Hardaker Trophy is an annual association football award presented to the Man of the Match in the EFL Cup final (also currently known as the Carabao Cup). The trophy is named after Alan Hardaker, the EFL's former secretary who conceived the League Cup.

The Alan Hardaker Trophy was first awarded in 1990, Des Walker was the inaugural recipient. Ben Foster, John Terry and Vincent Kompany have won the award on two occasions, the most wins by an individual. Both Manchester City and Manchester United have received the award six times, more than any other club. English players have won the trophy seventeen times, which is a record; the only other nations with multiple wins are Scotland, Belgium, and the Netherlands, with two recipients.

Winners

Key to score column
 – Indicates the match was decided by a replay
 – Indicates the match went to penalty shoot-out

Awards won by nationality

Awards won by club

References 

English football trophies and awards
EFL Cup